Elaphoglossum is a genus of ferns in the family Dryopteridaceae, subfamily Elaphoglossoideae, in the Pteridophyte Phylogeny Group classification of 2016 (PPG I). The genus has a large number of species. PPG I suggested there were about 600; Plants of the World Online and the Checklist of Ferns and Lycophytes of the World both listed at least 730 . The list below is from Plants of the World Online.

A

B

C

D

E–F

G

H

I–J

K–L

M

N–O

P

Q–R

S

T

U–Z

References

Elaphoglossum
Elaphoglossum